Scott Silveri is an American television producer and writer.

He is the creator of Go On and Speechless and the co-creator of Perfect Couples (with Jon Pollack) and Joey (with Shana Goldberg-Meehan, whom he met while working on the Harvard Lampoon and married in 2006). He was also a writer and executive producer on Friends.

Filmography

References

External links

American television producers
American television writers
American male television writers
American writers of Italian descent
The Harvard Lampoon alumni
Living people
Year of birth missing (living people)
Place of birth missing (living people)